Marin Ferecatu (born 3 May 1940) is a Romanian former sports shooter. He competed at the 1960 Summer Olympics and the 1968 Summer Olympics.

References

1940 births
Living people
People from Roșiorii de Vede
Romanian male sport shooters
Olympic shooters of Romania
Shooters at the 1960 Summer Olympics
Shooters at the 1968 Summer Olympics
20th-century Romanian people